The 1997–98 ACB season was the 16th season of the Liga ACB.

Regular season

Relegation playoffs

Ourense Xacobeo 99 and CB Ciudad de Huelva, relegated to LEB.

Championship Playoffs

See also
 Liga ACB

External links
 ACB.com 
 linguasport.com 

Liga ACB seasons
   
Spain